The Hafit period defines early Bronze Age human settlement in the United Arab Emirates and Oman in the period from 3200 to 2600 BC. It is named after the distinctive beehive burials first found on Jebel Hafit, a rocky mountain near Al Ain, bordering the Rub Al Khali desert. Hafit period tombs and remains have also been located across the UAE and Oman in sites such as Bidaa bint Saud, Jebel Al-Buhais and Buraimi.

Discoveries 
The first find of Hafit era tombs is attributed to the Danish archaeologist PV Glob in 1959, and the first of many excavations of these took place a few years later.

Located in the area south of the city of Al Ain, the Jebel Hafeet Desert Park contains the original necropolis of Hafit Graves which led to the naming of this period in human history in the emirates. A series of ridges leading from the main part of Jebel Hafit toward Al Ain each contain groups of Hafit tombs.

Finds at Jebel Hafit include the remains of some 317 circular stone tombs and settlements from the Hafit period, as well as wells and partially underground Falaj irrigation systems, as well as mud brick constructions intended for a range of defensive, domestic and economic purposes. The Al Ain Oasis, in particular, provides evidence of construction and water management enabling the early development of agriculture for five millennia, up until the present day.

Pottery finds at Hafit period sites demonstrate trading links to Mesopotamia, contiguous to the Jemdat Nasr period (3100 - 2900 BC). Evidence of trading links with Mesopotamia are also found in the subsequent Umm Al Nar and Wadi Suq periods of UAE history. 

Finds have shown that locally manufactured pottery emerged during the transitional period between the Hafit and Umm Al Nar periods, approximately 2800 to 2700 BCE. It is now thought the transition between the two cultural periods is marked by a decline in links between Southeastern Arabia and Mesopotamia, a pattern that would be repeated, albeit more emphatically, in the transitional period between the Umm Al Nar and Wadi Suq cultures.

See also 
 Hili Archaeological Park
List of Ancient Settlements in the UAE
 List of cultural property of national significance in the United Arab Emirates

References 

Ancient Near East
History of the United Arab Emirates
History of Oman
4th-millennium BC establishments